Stree can refer to:

 Stree (1961 film), an Indian fantasy film
 Stree (1968 film), an Indian Odia film
 Stree (1972 film), an Indian Bengali film
 Stree (2018 film), an Indian film starring Rajkummar Rao and Shraddha Kapoor
 Stree (TV series), a Bengali-language soap opera which premiered in 2016
 Stree (publisher), an imprint of Bhatkal and Sen, Calcutta

See also 
 Stri, a 1995 Indian Telugu film